Caryocolum tetrameris is a moth of the family Gelechiidae. It is found in Turkey, Iran and Afghanistan.

The length of the forewings is 6–7 mm for males and about 7 mm for females. The forewings are white, flecked with mid-brown and with indistinct dark brown markings. Adults have been recorded on wing from June to mid August.

References

Moths described in 1926
tetrameris
Moths of Asia